Schmidhauser is a surname. Notable people with the surname include:

Corinne Schmidhauser (born 1964), Swiss alpine skier
Hannes Schmidhauser (1926–2000), Swiss actor and footballer
John R. Schmidhauser (1922–2018), American politician